Kharawar railway station is a station on the Delhi–Rohtak line. It is located in the Indian state of Haryana. It serves Kharawar and surrounding area.

Kharawar village has an ancient well built in the beginning of 13th century by the Banjara traders who used to trade on the Lahore-Hapur route, via Firozpur-Dabwali-Sirsa-Hansi-Rohtak-Bahadurgarh-Delhi, using the caravans of carts drawn by camels and horses. These traders use to buy kasuri methi fenugreek, red chilli and other spices from Lahore, and jaggery, khaandsari, and other goods from Hapur for trade.

See also

 List of railway stations in Haryana
 Railway in Haryana
 Highways in Haryana

References

Railway stations in Rohtak district